Fernando Rodés Vilà (born 1 August 1960, in Barcelona) is a businessman specialised in marketing, communications and sustainability, and invests and manages companies operating in those fields.  Fernando is currently Vice Chairman of Havas (ticker: HAV) after having been its CEO 2006-2011, and CEO of MPG Havas Media 1999-2006.  He is founder, with his family, of the holding company ISP and several of its subsidiaries: Digilant, Acceso, In-Store Media and Antevenio (ticker: ALANT) among others.  Fernando is Founder and Chairman of Ara (newspaper) the leading digital and print media platform launched in Barcelona in 2010; Board member of Acciona (ticker: ANA) and Chairman of its Appointments and Retribution Committee; and one of the Spanish members of the Trilateral Commission. 
He is also Chairman of Advisory Board for Sustainable Development of the Catalan Government; is Chairman of Fundació Creafutur; and a founder and board member of Fundació Natura/Acció Natura.

Fernando lives in Barcelona, has five children named Joan, Sara, Manuela, Marc and Carlota and is married to Maria Macaya.

References

Spanish chief executives
Living people
1960 births